Coldirodi is a small medieval town in Liguria, Italy, situated on the hills between Sanremo and Ospedaletti. The town has approximately 3000 inhabitants and is today part of the Comune di Sanremo.

References

External links
 

Cities and towns in Liguria